Robins Tchale-Watchou (born 10 May 1983) is a former Cameroonian rugby union player and the CEO of Vivendi Sports and Chairman of the MMA league ARES. 

He played as a lock in France for Stade Français, Perpignan, Montpellier, and the Barbarians.

Life and career
Robins was born in 1983, in the University town of Dschang, Cameroon, the second of eight children. His father was a wood trader and former weightlifter. He was initially a basketball player and took up rugby at the age of sixteen after French rugby player Olivier Vachiet convinced him to swap sports. He made his début for Cameroon in 2002, aged 19.

He received his first professional contract in 2005, with Aurillac in the French Pro D2. In his first season Aurillac were relegated and Robins joined UA Gaillac, who had just been promoted to the D2. Gaillac are also relegated, this time for financial reasons, but Tchale-Watchou impressed and was signed by Top 14 club Auch Gers. Auch were once again relegated.

After Auch's relegation, he was signed by Paris club Stade Français. It was not a successful move for Robins, starting only 3 games all season. He was not offered a new contract by the club. He was signed by USA Perpignan in 2009, establishing himself as a key member of the side that reached the Top 14 final in 2010. He is known by the nicknames Bulldoz, Tchou Tchou and Pikachu.

In February 2018, Robins Tchale-Watchou is appointed CEO of Vivendi Sports, a Vivendi Group company whose aim is to design and organise sports competitions, drawing on the  Group’s expertise in the sports sector.

Robins is also:

Chairman of the Professional Union of French Rugby Players
Chairman of the French Federation of Sports Unions and Associations
Executive Board Member of French Rugby Federation
Executive board member of the National Rugby League (France)
Executive board member of the Rugby World Cup France 2023
Board Member at the IRPA (international rugby players association)

Honours
 Top 14 Finalist – 2009–10
 Winner of the European Rugby Challenge Cup - 2015-16

References

1983 births
Living people
Cameroonian rugby union players
People from Dschang
Stade Français players
USA Perpignan players
Rugby union locks
Cameroonian expatriate rugby union players
Expatriate rugby union players in France
Cameroonian expatriates in France